Acrocercops querci is a moth of the family Gracillariidae. It is known from Japan (Honshū).

The wingspan is 7–9.8 mm.

The larvae feed on Quercus species, including Quercus glauca. They mine the leaves of their host plant.

References

querci
Moths described in 1988
Moths of Japan